Max Martial Kouguère (born 12 March 1987) is a Central African professional basketball player who last played for Bangui Sporting Club. He is a member of the Central African Republic national basketball team.

Professional career
Before signing with Olympique Antibes for the 2009–10 season, Kouguère played for fellow French League team BCM Gravelines. He rarely saw action, playing only 64 minutes spread out over 11 games during the season.  Despite this, the  Kouguère gained a cult following in France through his dunking ability and participation in several slam dunk contests in France.

On 23 September 2021, Kouguere signed with Belgian club Phoenix Brussels of the BNXT League.

In October 2022, Kouguere played for Bangui Sporting Club in the 2023 BAL qualification. He made his debut on 12 October against Espoir.

National team career
Kouguère was a member of the Central African Republic national basketball team that finished sixth at the 2009 FIBA Africa Championship, averaging 9.3 PPG.

References

1987 births
Living people
Bàsquet Manresa players
BCM Gravelines players
Boulazac Basket Dordogne players
Brussels Basketball players
Central African Republic expatriate basketball people in Spain
Central African Republic expatriate basketball people in Belgium
Central African Republic expatriate basketball people in Switzerland
Central African Republic men's basketball players
Central African Republic people of Republic of the Congo descent
Élan Béarnais players
Central African Republic expatriate basketball people in France
Le Mans Sarthe Basket players
Liga ACB players
Lions de Genève players
Olympique Antibes basketball players
Orléans Loiret Basket players
Rouen Métropole Basket players
Saint-Chamond Basket players
Small forwards
Sportspeople from Brazzaville
Sportspeople of Republic of the Congo descent
STB Le Havre players
Bangui Sporting Club players
Republic of the Congo expatriate basketball people in France
Republic of the Congo expatriate basketball people in Spain
Republic of the Congo expatriate basketball people in Belgium
Republic of the Congo expatriate basketball people in Switzerland